Bowman Glacier is a deeply entrenched glacier,  long, descending the polar plateau between the Quarles Range and the Rawson Plateau of the Queen Maud Mountains to enter the Ross Ice Shelf just west of the flow of Amundsen Glacier. It was discovered in December 1929 by the Byrd Antarctic Expedition geological party under Laurence Gould, and named by Richard E. Byrd for Isaiah Bowman, an eminent geographer who was president of Johns Hopkins University, 1935–49, and Director of the American Geographical Society, 1915–35.

See also
 List of glaciers in the Antarctic
 Glaciology

References 

Glaciers of Amundsen Coast